Connect2India is an international trading platform that enables micro, small and medium enterprises (SMEs) to import from and export to India.

History

Foundation 
The company was founded in December, 2015 by Pawan Gupta. He developed the platform to present transparent, accurate, analytical and complete information on trading parameters that was previously lacking amongst Indian SME traders.

Expansion 
Connect2India uses blockchain technology combined with GPS, RFID and IoT to counter International Trade Frauds. It is a platform where an enterprise or an individual from anywhere can find global opportunities to trade from India. It was later initiated in both tier 2 and tier 3 cities of India.

Business

Connect2India has now become world's trade information provider and is expanded to twenty cities of India that includes Pune, Ahmedabad, Ludhiana, Indore, Kanpur, Hyderabad, Bengaluru, Delhi Surat, Jaipur, Rajkot and Varanasi. All the enterprises from the major countries can have the trade information and can get complete trading solution by enabling market place of traders. The company also provides this information to five major Europe countries like Germany, France, Belgium, Italy and Spain. Connect2India uses internet and technology and is listing 7.5 million SMEs and provides trading platform in almost all the major sectors like agriculture, machinery, handicrafts, paper, garments, etc.

Tie ups 

 Connect2India has tied up with Tata Chemicals subsidiary, encourage Social Enterprise Foundation, for 'Tata Swach' purifier project

References 

Electronic trading platforms